Jan Veleba (born 25 August 1947 in Nové Město na Moravě) is a Czech politician and agricultural functionary. He was a Senator of the Parliament of the Czech Republic since 2012 Czech Senate election. In March 2014 he was elected a new Chairman of the Party of Civic Rights after Zdeněk Štengl.

References

1947 births
Living people
People from Nové Město na Moravě
Party of Civic Rights politicians
Mendel University Brno alumni
Masaryk University alumni
Members of the Senate of the Czech Republic